Scott Park Baseball Complex is a baseball venue in Toledo, Ohio.  It is home to the Toledo Rockets baseball team of the NCAA Division I Mid-American Conference.  The venue has a capacity of 1,000 spectators.  It features stadium lighting, a locker room, dugouts, and a natural grass surface.  Its dimensions are 330 feet in left field, 400 feet in center field, and 330 feet in right field.

See also
 List of NCAA Division I baseball venues

References 

College baseball venues in the United States
Baseball venues in Ohio
Toledo Rockets baseball